Honora is a genus of snout moths described by Augustus Radcliffe Grote in 1878.

Species
Honora dotella Dyar, 1910
Honora mellinella Grote, 1878
Honora montinatatella (Hulst, 1887)
Honora perdubiella (Dyar, 1905)
Honora sciurella Ragonot, 1887
Honora subsciurella Ragonot, 1887

References

Phycitinae